Amanda Bayer is an American economist who is the Franklin and Betty Barr professor of economics at Swarthmore College and a visiting senior adviser to the Board of Governors of the Federal Reserve System, known for her recent work on ways to increase the number of women and underrepresented minority students who major in economics and enter the economics profession.

Career 
Bayer has been a member of the faculty at Swarthmore College since 1992. Since 2015, she has worked with the Federal Reserve to widen the group of applicants for its economist and research assistant positions. She has also worked to create resources for Economics professors to be more inclusive in their teaching practices, and has conducted and published research on the effectiveness of these resources. This work has been covered by major media publications. She was elected to the Executive Committee of the American Economic Association in 2021.

Selected works 

 Bayer, Amanda, and Cecilia Elena Rouse. "Diversity in the economics profession: A new attack on an old problem." Journal of Economic Perspectives 30, no. 4 (2016): 221–42.
 Bayer, Amanda, Jean Baldwin Grossman, and David L. DuBois. "Using volunteer mentors to improve the academic outcomes of underserved students: The role of relationships." Journal of Community Psychology 43, no. 4 (2015): 408–429.
 Bayer, Amanda, Syon P. Bhanot, and Fernando Lozano. "Does simple information provision lead to more diverse classrooms? Evidence from a field experiment on undergraduate economics." AEA Papers and Proceedings, vol. 109, pp. 110–14. 2019.
 Bayer, Amanda, Gary A. Hoover, and Ebonya Washington. "How You Can Work to Increase the Presence and Improve the Experience of Black, Latinx, and Native American People in the Economics Profession." Journal of Economic Perspectives 34, no. 3 (2020): 193–219.
 Bayer, Amanda, and David W. Wilcox. "The unequal distribution of economic education: A report on the race, ethnicity, and gender of economics majors at US colleges and universities." The Journal of Economic Education 50, no. 3 (2019): 299–320.
 Bayer, Amanda, Gregory Bruich, Raj Chetty, and Andrew Housiaux. "Expanding and diversifying the pool of undergraduates who study economics: Insights from a new introductory course at Harvard." The Journal of Economic Education 51, no. 3-4 (2020): 364-379.

References 

American women economists
21st-century American economists
Swarthmore College faculty
Yale Graduate School of Arts and Sciences alumni
Williams College alumni
Living people
Labor economists
Year of birth missing (living people)
21st-century American women